Orchestrated objective reduction (Orch OR) is a theory which postulates that consciousness originates at the quantum level inside neurons, rather than the conventional view that it is a product of connections between neurons. The mechanism is held to be a quantum process called objective reduction that is orchestrated by cellular structures called microtubules. It is proposed that the theory may answer the hard problem of consciousness and provide a mechanism for free will. The hypothesis was first put forward in the early 1990s by Nobel laureate for physics, Roger Penrose, and anaesthesiologist and psychologist Stuart Hameroff. The hypothesis combines approaches from molecular biology, neuroscience, pharmacology, philosophy, quantum information theory, and quantum gravity.

While mainstream theories assert that consciousness emerges as the complexity of the computations performed by cerebral neurons increases, Orch OR posits that consciousness is based on non-computable quantum processing performed by qubits formed collectively on cellular microtubules, a process significantly amplified in the neurons. The qubits are based on oscillating dipoles forming superposed resonance rings in helical pathways throughout lattices of microtubules. The oscillations are either electric, due to charge separation from London forces, or magnetic, due to electron spin—and possibly also due to nuclear spins (that can remain isolated for longer periods) that occur in gigahertz, megahertz and kilohertz frequency ranges. Orchestration refers to the hypothetical process by which connective proteins, such as microtubule-associated proteins (MAPs), influence or orchestrate qubit state reduction by modifying the spacetime-separation of their superimposed states. The latter is based on Penrose's objective-collapse theory for interpreting quantum mechanics, which postulates the existence of an objective threshold governing the collapse of quantum-states, related to the difference of the spacetime curvature of these states in the universe's fine-scale structure.

Orchestrated objective reduction has been criticized from its inception by mathematicians, philosophers, and scientists. The criticism concentrated on three issues: Penrose's interpretation of Gödel's theorem; Penrose's abductive reasoning linking non-computability to quantum events; and the brain's unsuitability to host the quantum phenomena required by the theory, since it is considered too "warm, wet and noisy" to avoid decoherence.

Background

In 1931, mathematician and logician Kurt Gödel proved that any effectively generated theory capable of proving basic arithmetic cannot be both consistent and complete. In other words, a mathematically sound theory lacks the means to prove itself. An analogous statement has been used to show that humans are subject to the same limits as machines. However, in his first book on consciousness, The Emperor's New Mind (1989), Roger Penrose argued that Gödel-unprovable results are provable by human mathematicians. He takes this disparity to mean that human mathematicians are not describable as formal proof systems, and are therefore running a non-computable algorithm.

If correct, the Penrose–Lucas argument leaves the question of the physical basis of non-computable behaviour open. Most physical laws are computable, and thus algorithmic. However, Penrose determined that wave function collapse was a prime candidate for a non-computable process. In quantum mechanics, particles are treated differently from the objects of classical mechanics. Particles are described by wave functions that evolve according to the Schrödinger equation. Non-stationary wave functions are linear combinations of the eigenstates of the system, a phenomenon described by the superposition principle. When a quantum system interacts with a classical system—i.e. when an observable is measured—the system appears to collapse to a random eigenstate of that observable from a classical vantage point.

If collapse is truly random, then no process or algorithm can deterministically predict its outcome. This provided Penrose with a candidate for the physical basis of the non-computable process that he hypothesized to exist in the brain. However, he disliked the random nature of environmentally induced collapse, as randomness was not a promising basis for mathematical understanding. Penrose proposed that isolated systems may still undergo a new form of wave function collapse, which he called objective reduction (OR).

Penrose sought to reconcile general relativity and quantum theory using his own ideas about the possible structure of spacetime. He suggested that at the Planck scale curved spacetime is not continuous, but discrete. He further postulated that each separated quantum superposition has its own piece of spacetime curvature, a blister in spacetime. The rough threshold for OR is given by Penrose's indeterminacy principle:

where:
  is the time until OR occurs, 
  is the gravitational self-energy or the degree of spacetime separation given by the superpositioned mass, and
  is the reduced Planck constant. 
Thus, the greater the mass–energy of the object, the faster it will undergo OR and vice versa. Mesoscopic objects could collapse on a timescale relevant to neural processing.

An essential feature of Penrose's theory is that the choice of states when objective reduction occurs is selected neither randomly (as are choices following wave function collapse) nor algorithmically. Rather, states are selected by a "non-computable" influence embedded in the Planck scale of spacetime geometry. Penrose claimed that such information is Platonic, representing pure mathematical truths, which relates to Penrose's ideas concerning the three worlds: the physical, the mental, and  the Platonic mathematical world. In Shadows of the Mind (1994), Penrose briefly indicates that this Platonic world could also include aesthetic and ethical values, but he does not commit to this further hypothesis.

The Penrose–Lucas argument was criticized by mathematicians, computer scientists, and philosophers, and the consensus among experts in these fields is that the argument fails, with different authors attacking different aspects of the argument. Minsky argued that because humans can believe false ideas to be true, human mathematical understanding need not be consistent and consciousness may easily have a deterministic basis. Feferman argued that mathematicians do not progress by mechanistic search through proofs, but by trial-and-error reasoning, insight and inspiration, and that machines do not share this approach with humans.

Orch OR
Penrose outlined a predecessor to Orch OR in The Emperor's New Mind, coming to the problem from a mathematical viewpoint and in particular Gödel's theorem, but lacked a detailed proposal for how quantum processes could be implemented in the brain. Stuart Hameroff separately worked in cancer research and anesthesia, which gave him an interest in brain processes. Hameroff read Penrose's book and suggested to him that microtubules within neurons were suitable candidate sites for quantum processing, and ultimately for consciousness. Throughout the 1990s, the two collaborated on the Orch OR theory, which Penrose published in Shadows of the Mind (1994).

Hameroff's contribution to the theory derived from his study of the neural cytoskeleton, and particularly on microtubules. As neuroscience has progressed, the role of the cytoskeleton and microtubules has assumed greater importance. In addition to providing structural support, microtubule functions include axoplasmic transport and control of the cell's movement, growth and shape.

Orch OR combines the Penrose–Lucas argument with Hameroff's hypothesis on quantum processing in microtubules. It proposes that when condensates in the brain undergo an objective wave function reduction, their collapse connects noncomputational decision-making to experiences embedded in spacetime's fundamental geometry. The theory further proposes that the microtubules both influence and are influenced by the conventional activity at the synapses between neurons.

Microtubule computation

Hameroff proposed that microtubules were suitable candidates for quantum processing. Microtubules are made up of tubulin protein subunits. The tubulin protein dimers of the microtubules have hydrophobic pockets that may contain delocalized π electrons. Tubulin has other, smaller non-polar regions, for example 8 tryptophans per tubulin, which contain π electron-rich indole rings distributed throughout tubulin with separations of roughly 2 nm. Hameroff claims that this is close enough for the tubulin π electrons to become quantum entangled. During entanglement, particle states become inseparably correlated.
Hameroff originally suggested in the fringe Journal of Cosmology that the tubulin-subunit electrons would form a Bose–Einstein condensate. He then proposed a Frohlich condensate, a hypothetical coherent oscillation of dipolar molecules. However, this too was rejected by Reimers' group. Hameroff then responded to Reimers. "Reimers et al have most definitely NOT shown that strong or coherent Frohlich condensation in microtubules is unfeasible. The model microtubule on which they base their Hamiltonian is not a microtubule structure, but a simple linear chain of oscillators." Hameroff reasoned that such condensate behavior would magnify nanoscopic quantum effects to have large scale influences in the brain.

Hameroff then proposed that condensates in microtubules in one neuron can link with microtubule condensates in other neurons and glial cells via the gap junctions of electrical synapses. Hameroff proposed that the gap between the cells is sufficiently small that quantum objects can tunnel across it, allowing them to extend across a large area of the brain. He further postulated that the action of this large-scale quantum activity is the source of 40 Hz gamma waves, building upon the much less controversial theory that gap junctions are related to the gamma oscillation.

Related experimental results
In April 2022, the results of two related experiments were presented at The Science of Consciousness conference. In a study Hameroff was part of, Jack Tuszyński of the University of Alberta demonstrated that anesthetics hasten the duration of a process called delayed luminescence, in which microtubules and tubulins  trapped light. Tuszyński suspects that the phenomenon has a quantum origin, with superradiance being investigated as one possibility. In the second experiment, Gregory D. Scholes and Aarat Kalra of Princeton University used lasers to excite molecules within tubulins, causing a prolonged excitation to diffuse through microtubules farther than expected, which did not occur when repeated under anesthesia. However, diffusion results have to be interpreted carefully, since even classical diffusion can be very complex due to the wide range of length scales in the fluid filled extracellular space.

Microtubule quantum vibration theory of anesthetic action 

At high concentrations (~5 MAC) the anesthetic gas halothane causes reversible depolymerization of microtubules. This cannot be the mechanism of anesthetic action, however, because human anesthesia is performed at 1 MAC. (It is important to note that neither Penrose or Hameroff ever claim that depolymerization is the mechanism of action for ORCH OR. )
At ~1 MAC halothane, reported minor changes in tubulin protein expression (~1.3-fold) in primary cortical neurons after exposure to halothane and isoflurane are not evidence that tublin directly interacts with general anesthetics, but rather shows that the proteins controlling tubulin production are possible anesthetic targets.
Further proteomic study reports 0.5 mM [14C]halothane binding to tubulin monomers alongside three dozens of other proteins.
In addition, modulation of microtubule stability has been reported during anthracene general anesthesia of tadpoles.

What might anesthetics do to microtubules to cause loss of consciousness? A  highly disputed theory put forth in the mid-1990s  by Stuart Hameroff and Sir Roger Penrose posits that consciousness is based on quantum vibrations in tubulin/microtubules inside brain neurons. Computer modeling of tubulin's atomic structure found that anesthetic gas molecules bind adjacent to amino acid aromatic rings of non-polar π-electrons and that collective quantum dipole oscillations among all π-electron resonance rings in each tubulin showed a spectrum with a common mode peak at 613 THz. Simulated presence of 8 different anesthetic gases abolished the 613 THz peak, whereas the presence of 2 different nonanesthetic gases did not affect the 613 THz peak, from which it was speculated that this 613 THz peak in microtubules could be related to consciousness and anesthetic action.

The 'Microtubule quantum vibration theory' of anesthetic action is controversial due to several critical flaws in the premise of Orch OR and falsification of data used in support of the theory.

Criticism

Orch OR has been criticized both by physicists and neuroscientists who consider it to be a poor model of brain physiology. Orch OR has also been criticized for lacking explanatory power; the philosopher Patricia Churchland wrote, "Pixie dust in the synapses is about as explanatorily powerful as quantum coherence in the microtubules."

David Chalmers argues against quantum consciousness. He instead discusses how quantum mechanics may relate to dualistic consciousness. Chalmers is skeptical that any new physics can resolve the hard problem of consciousness. He argues that quantum theories of consciousness suffer from the same weakness as more conventional theories. Just as he argues that there is no particular reason why particular macroscopic physical features in the brain should give rise to consciousness, he also thinks that there is no particular reason why a particular quantum feature, such as the EM field in the brain, should give rise to consciousness either.

Decoherence in living organisms
In 2000 Max Tegmark claimed that any quantum coherent system in the brain would undergo effective wave function collapse due to environmental interaction long before it could influence neural processes (the "warm, wet and noisy" argument, as it was later came to be known). He determined the decoherence timescale of microtubule entanglement at brain temperatures to be on the order of femtoseconds, far too brief for neural processing. Christof Koch and Klaus Hepp also agreed that quantum coherence does not play, or does not need to play any major role in neurophysiology. Koch and Hepp concluded that "The empirical demonstration of slowly decoherent and controllable quantum bits in neurons connected by electrical or chemical synapses, or the discovery of an efficient quantum algorithm for computations performed by the brain, would do much to bring these speculations from the 'far-out' to the mere 'very unlikely'."

In response to Tegmark's claims, Hagan, Tuszynski and Hameroff claimed that Tegmark did not address the Orch OR model, but instead a model of his own construction. This involved superpositions of quanta separated by 24 nm rather than the much smaller separations stipulated for Orch OR. As a result, Hameroff's group claimed a decoherence time seven orders of magnitude greater than Tegmark's, although still far below 25 ms. Hameroff's group also suggested that the Debye layer of counterions could screen thermal fluctuations, and that the surrounding actin gel might enhance the ordering of water, further screening noise. They also suggested that incoherent metabolic energy could further order water, and finally that the configuration of the microtubule lattice might be suitable for quantum error correction, a means of resisting quantum decoherence.

In 2009, Reimers et al. and McKemmish et al., published critical assessments. Earlier versions of the theory had required tubulin-electrons to form either Bose–Einsteins or Frohlich condensates, and the Reimers group noted the lack of empirical evidence that such could occur. Additionally they calculated that microtubules could only support weak 8 MHz coherence. McKemmish et al. argued that aromatic molecules cannot switch states because they are delocalised; and that changes in tubulin protein-conformation driven by GTP conversion would result in a prohibitive energy requirement.

In 2022, a group of Italian researchers performed several experiments that falsified a related hypothesis by physicist Lajos Diósi.

Neuroscience

Hameroff frequently writes: "A typical brain neuron has roughly 107 tubulins (Yu and Baas, 1994)", yet this is Hameroff's own invention, which should not be attributed to Yu and Baas. Hameroff apparently misunderstood that Yu and Baas actually "reconstructed the microtubule (MT) arrays of a 56 μm axon from a cell that had undergone axon differentiation" and this reconstructed axon "contained 1430 MTs ... and the total MT length was 5750 μm." A direct calculation shows that 107 tubulins (to be precise 9.3 × 106 tubulins) correspond to this MT length of 5750 μm inside the 56 μm axon.

Hameroff's 1998 hypothesis required that cortical dendrites contain primarily 'A' lattice microtubules, but in 1994 Kikkawa et al. showed that all in vivo microtubules have a 'B' lattice and a seam.

Orch OR also required gap junctions between neurons and glial cells, yet Binmöller et al. proved in 1992 that these don't exist in the adult brain. In vitro research with primary neuronal cultures shows evidence for electrotonic (gap junction) coupling between immature neurons and astrocytes obtained from rat embryos extracted prematurely through Cesarean section; however, the Orch OR claim is that mature neurons are electrotonically coupled to astrocytes in the adult brain. Therefore, Orch OR contradicts the well-documented electrotonic decoupling of neurons from astrocytes in the process of neuronal maturation, which is stated by Fróes et al. as follows: "junctional communication may provide metabolic and electrotonic interconnections between neuronal and astrocytic networks at early stages of neural development and such interactions are weakened as differentiation progresses."

Other biology-based criticisms have been offered, including a lack of explanation for the probabilistic release of neurotransmitter from presynaptic axon terminals and an error in the calculated number of the tubulin dimers per cortical neuron.

In 2014, Penrose and Hameroff published responses to some criticisms and revisions to many of the theory's peripheral assumptions, while retaining the core hypothesis.

See also

 Copenhagen interpretation
 Electromagnetic theories of consciousness
 Holonomic brain theory
 Many-minds interpretation
 Penrose interpretation
 Quantum Aspects of Life (book)
 Quantum mind
 Quantum cognition

References

External links
 Center for Consciousness Studies homepage
 Quantum-Mind
 Hameroff's "Quantum Consciousness" site
 Roger Penrose (1999) Science and the Mind. Kavli Institute for Theoretical Physics Public Lectures, May 12, 1999.

Philosophy of mind
Quantum mind
Quantum biology